Robert Brooks Beall (born April 24, 1948) is a former professional American baseball player who played Major League Baseball for the Atlanta Braves (-) and the Pittsburgh Pirates in . He played in a total of 148 games in his four-year Major League career, leaving with .231 average.

Early years
Beall graduated from Hillsboro High School in 1966, where he won a state championship his senior year. During his high school career he played for coach Ad Rutschman, and participated in the first game at Hare Field in 1965. After his senior year he was named player of the year in Oregon and was offered scholarships to the University of Oregon and Oregon State University.

He choose Oregon State in Corvallis where he would serve as captain of the baseball team and was selected to the Pacific-8 (now Pac-12 Conference) all-conference team as the first baseman. Additionally, Beall became the first left-handed third baseman in the history of the conference.

His two brothers Jim and Gene also graduated from Hillsboro High, with Jim also playing baseball at OSU before moving to politics.

Beall was drafted in the 28th round of the 1970 amateur draft after graduating with a bachelor's degree in mathematics.

Professional baseball
After leaving Oregon State, the 5-10 first baseman spent several years in the minor leagues. He had signed with the Philadelphia Phillies of the National League and sent to their Walla Walla, Washington, farm team. There he hit for a .389 average for Walla Walla, followed by .314 in the Carolina League. He then spent the next few years moving up through the Phillies farm system. After a year in triple A ball for the Eugene Emeralds, Beall was traded to the Atlanta Braves and played with their triple A team in Richmond, Virginia. Other stops included Reading, Pennsylvania, the Dominican Republic, and Mexico over a 12-year period playing professional baseball.

On May 12, 1975, Beall made his major league debut playing first base for the Atlanta Braves. During the  season he played eight games and hit for a .226 batting average with one run batted in. After spending the next few years in the minor leagues, he returned to Atlanta for the  season. That season he hit one home run, drove in 16 runs, while batting .243 over 108 games. The next season was his last for the Braves, and he played in 17 games and hit .133. 1980 was his last year in the Major Leagues, where he played in three games without a single hit for the Pittsburgh Pirates. In his 148-game career he hit .231 in 234 at-bats with one home run, 18 RBIs, and a .987 fielding average. After leaving the Pirates, he spent some time with the Portland Beavers minor league team in Portland, Oregon. With the Beavers he was a player-coach at a time when the team was the triple A affiliate for the Pirates. He then retired in 1981 and returned to Hillsboro and began working for sportswear company Nike.

References

External links

Bob Beall at Baseball Almanac]

1948 births
Living people
Major League Baseball first basemen
Atlanta Braves players
Pittsburgh Pirates players
Richmond Braves players
Walla Walla Phillies players
Eugene Emeralds players
Portland Beavers players
Peninsula Phillies players
Oregon State Beavers baseball players
Baseball players from Portland, Oregon
Sportspeople from Hillsboro, Oregon
Baseball players from Atlanta
Águilas Cibaeñas players
American expatriate baseball players in the Dominican Republic
Hillsboro High School (Oregon) alumni